The AJW Junior Championship was a tertiary singles title in All Japan Women's Pro-Wrestling. The title started in 1980 and was retired in April 2005 when the promotion closed.

The prize was contested among wrestlers with less than two years of experience in professional wrestling. 
The first belt design was a brown belt that also represented the AJW Championship. Later, the Junior Championship became a golden belt with a turquoise strap.

Title history

Combined reigns

Footnotes

See also 

 List of professional wrestling promotions in Japan
 List of women's wrestling promotions
 Professional wrestling in Japan

References 

All Japan Women's Pro-Wrestling Championships
Women's professional wrestling championships